Rosa Guraieb Kuri (20 May 1931 – 2 March 2014) was a Mexican pianist, music educator and composer of Lebanese ancestry. She was born in Matías Romero, Oaxaca, Mexico, and studied in Beirut with Michel Cheskinoff at the National Conservatory. She continued her education in Mexico with José Pablo Moncayo and Salvador Ordones Ochoa at the Conservatory of Mexico, then at Yale University and in Bayreuth, Germany.

Works
Selected works include:
Me vas a dejar
Reflejos
Otoño
Sonata para violín y piano
Lejos
Pieza Ciclica
Palomita veloz
Puerto de arribo
Para entonces
La tarde

Her works have been recorded and issued on CD, including:
Otoño Homage to Mexican composer Rosa Guraieb (2005)

References

1931 births
2014 deaths
20th-century classical composers
Mexican women classical composers
Mexican classical composers
Musicians from Oaxaca
Mexican people of Lebanese descent
Yale University alumni
20th-century women composers